Sunny Kurian is a Sharjah-based Indian-born pediatrician and the founder president of the UAE wing of the Indian Academy of Pediatrics (IAP). He is the founder trustee of the Indian Business and Professional Council (IBPC) and the chairman of Dr. Sunny's Group which he established in Sharjah in 1990.

Biography
Sunny Kurian was born in the Indian state of Goa, then a Union Territory, in a Malayali family settled there. His medical education was at the J. J. M. Medical College, Davangere under Mysore University, from where he secured his master's degree (MD) in pediatrics. He moved to Sharjah in the United Arab Emirates in 1989 and a year later, established his own medical practice under the name, Dr. Sunny's Clinic. The centre slowly grew to become a business conglomerate, Dr. Sunny's Healthcare Group, with six multispecialty medical centres and business interests in pharmaceuticals, opticals and education.

Kurian, holder of a higher degree in adolescent medicine (PGDAP), is a founder trustee of the Indian Business and Professional Council (IBPC) and holds the position of its vice chairman. He is a founder of the Association of Kerala Medical Graduates (AKMG), an affiliate association of IBPC involved in charitable and educational projects, of which he served as the first secretary general and is the president of its Sharjah chapter. His contribution is reported behind the establishment of the United Arab Emirates branch of the Indian Academy of Pediatrics in 2011, the first branch of the academy outside India. He also sits on the board of trustees of the India Trade and Exhibitions Centre, Middle East (ITEC).

Kurian was ranked 70 among the Top 100 Indian Leaders in the UAE by the Forbes Middle East in 2014. Arabian Business, a Dubai based business magazine rated him in 2014 as the 39th richest Indian in the United Arab Emirates. He received the Kerala State Business Excellence Award for the category, Kerala Global Achievers in 2014. He is also a recipient of the Sharjah Economic Excellence Award twice (2008, 2009) and the Sharjah Police Appreciation Award in 2011 and 2012.

In 2015, The Sunny Healthcare group was acquired by Abu Dhabi based NMC Health group for US$64 million. Subsequent to acquisition, NMC Health renamed The Sunny Healthcare group as NMC Sunny.

Sunny Kurian, a known sports enthusiast involved in promoting local sporting events such as Berry Hills Indian Basketball League and Dr Sunny's Medical Centre AKCC cricket tournament, is married to his former classmate at Davangere, Meera Kurien, a consultant physician. The couple have two daughters and the family lives in Sharjah.

See also
 Indian Academy of Pediatrics

References

Living people
Indian paediatricians
Malayali people
Businesspeople from Goa
Indian expatriates in the United Arab Emirates
University of Mysore alumni
Year of birth missing (living people)